The Fremont Arts Council (FAC) is a community-run organization that supports arts and artists.  The Council resides in the Fremont, Seattle, Washington, but its members are from throughout the city.

History
The Fremont Arts Council was founded in the Fremont neighborhood of Seattle, Washington, in 1979.

Events

The Fremont Arts Council sponsors several annual events including the Summer Solstice Parade and Pageant, May Day, Troll-a-ween, and the Winter Solstice Feast.

The Summer Solstice Parade and Pageant is an arts festival held annually. 

Luminata is held annually on the autumnal equinox.

Public Art

FAC has been responsible for the installation and maintenance of several public artworks in the Fremont area. These include the Fremont Troll and Waiting for the Interurban.

Fremont Troll

One of Seattle's most popular public artworks, the Fremont Troll, is a mixed-media megalithic statue, located on N. 36th Street at Troll Avenue N., under the north end of the Aurora Bridge. (Troll Avenue was renamed in its honor in 2005.) It is clutching an actual original Volkswagen Beetle, as if it had just swiped it from the roadway above. In light of Seattle P–I columnist Emmett Watson's periodic promotion of the KBO, the vehicle had a California license plate.

The piece was commissioned by the Fremont Arts Council in 1989, and built in 1990. The Troll was sculpted by four local artists: Steve Badanes, Will Martin, Donna Walter and Ross Whitehead.

Waiting for the Interurban

"Waiting for the Interurban" is a 1979 cast aluminum sculpture collection by Richard Beyer in the Fremont neighborhood of Seattle. It is located on the south side of N. 34th Street, just east of the northern end of the Fremont Bridge. It consists of six people standing under a shelter and waiting for public transportation—specifically, the Seattle-Everett Interurban.

The sculpture is a few blocks west of Troll Avenue N., the location of the Fremont Troll.

See also
Bohemianism
Culture jamming

External links

Culture of Seattle
DIY culture
Arts Council
Pacific Northwest art
Social networks